Nazareno Daniel Bazán Vera (born 8 March 1999) is an Argentine professional footballer who plays as a forward for Almirante Brown.

Career

Club
Bazán's first club was Vélez Sarsfield. His professional football debut arrived against Lanús on 4 December 2017, midway through the 2017–18 Argentine Primera División campaign which Vélez Sarsfield ended in 14th; with Bazán appearing twice.

International
In June 2017, Bazán was selected to train with the Argentina national team in Australia and Singapore.

Personal life
Bazán is the nephew of former footballer Daniel Bazán Vera.

Career statistics
.

References

External links

1999 births
Living people
Footballers from Buenos Aires
Argentine footballers
Argentine expatriate footballers
Association football forwards
Argentine Primera División players
Ecuadorian Serie A players
Paraguayan Primera División players
Primera Nacional players
Club Atlético Vélez Sarsfield footballers
C.D. Universidad Católica del Ecuador footballers
Sportivo Luqueño players
CSyD Tristán Suárez footballers
Club Almirante Brown footballers
Argentine expatriate sportspeople in Ecuador
Argentine expatriate sportspeople in Paraguay
Expatriate footballers in Ecuador
Expatriate footballers in Paraguay